"Comeback" is a song by English singer Ella Eyre. It was released on 28 September 2014 as the second single from her debut studio album Feline. Eyre wrote "Comeback" at the age of 16 following a break-up, and summed it up as "about being taken advantage of by somebody that you care about, and then eventually you’re angry about the whole situation but it’s almost like saying 'Fuck it, it doesn’t matter because they’ll come back anyway'." The song has charted at number 12 on the UK Singles Chart.

Music video
A music video to accompany the release of "Comeback" was first released onto YouTube on 17 August 2014. Directed by Jon Jon Augustavo, it tried to contrast the more artistic vision of "If I Go" with a plot-driven video that  had a comedic spin on the song's angry lyrics, summed up by Eyre as "fun like, ‘I’m a bitch.’".  In the video, Eyre and her boyfriend are in a diner, where he starts a break up discussion. Eyre then daydreams about going with her friends to his house and wrecking the place, followed by setting his car on fire. Once the man calls for Eyre's attention as the dream sequence ends, she throws her drink on him and walks away smiling. Eyre stated that it was an attempt to depict a revenge plot "in a sort of innocent way", taking 
in a sequence that only happens in the character's imagination how "everybody can feel this way and get so angry at someone you think about how to ruin their life".

Track listing

Chart performance

Weekly charts

Release history

Certifications

References

Song recordings produced by Ilya Salmanzadeh
Songs written by Ilya Salmanzadeh
Songs written by Oscar Görres
2014 songs
Virgin EMI Records singles
Songs written by Ella Eyre
Ella Eyre songs
Songs written by Alexander Kronlund